There are several 2017 UCI World Championships. The International Cycling Union (UCI) holds World Championships every year. For 2017, this includes:

 2017 UCI Road World Championships
 2017 UCI Track Cycling World Championships
 2017 UCI Mountain Bike World Championships
 2017 UCI Cyclo-cross World Championships
 2017 UCI BMX World Championships
 2017 UCI Urban Cycling World Championships

UCI World Championships
UCI World Championships